The TR GSL  class was a class of  gauge  geared steam locomotives built by Sentinel Waggon Works in Shrewsbury, Shropshire, England, for the Tanganyika Railway (TR).

The eight members of the GSL class entered service on the TR between 1929 and 1931.  They were operated by the TR until it was succeeded by the East African Railways (EAR) in 1948.  They then served with the EAR until the mid 1950s.

See also

History of rail transport in Tanzania

References

Notes

Bibliography

External links

East African Railways locomotives
Metre gauge steam locomotives
Railway locomotives introduced in 1929
Sentinel locomotives
Steam locomotives of Tanzania
GSL
0-4-0T locomotives
Scrapped locomotives